Tarache aprica, the exposed bird dropping moth, is a moth of the family Noctuidae. The species was first described by Jacob Hübner in 1808. It is found in North America from Ontario and Quebec to Florida, west to Arizona, north to Kansas and Iowa. There are some records from Great Britain, but this probably relates to imports.

The habitat consists of gardens, fields and open areas.

The adults are sexually dimorphic. The male forewing is basally white with two black patches along the costa, the distal patch merging with general blackish shading beyond PM line, leaving a white patch near the apex. The female forewing is mostly dark gray or blackish except for two white patches along the costa, and some white at the base and outer margin. There is a small black orbicular spot surrounded by white, which is usually prominent in both sexes. The hindwing is whitish or pale gray. There is a dark grayish-brown shading along the outer margin in the females.

The wingspan is 15–29 mm. Adults are on wing from March to September in the south. They have a reduced season in the north.

The larvae feed on Alcea rosea.

References

External links

Acontiinae
Moths of North America
Moths described in 1808